Women of San Quentin is a 1983 TV movie about female prison guards at San Quentin Prison. It stars Stella Stevens and Debbie Allen.

It was based on a story by Larry Cohen. He had gone to San Quentin to research a different project and was intrigued by finding a female guard there. He sold it to television but says it was rewritten and changed from the story he originally conceived.

Premise

A young female prison guard finds out her first assignment is to San Quentin, one of the toughest prisons in the country.

Cast

 Stella Stevens as Lieutenant Janet Alexander 
 Debbie Allen as Carol Freeman 
 Hector Elizondo as Captain Mike Reyes
 Amy Steel as Liz Larson
 Rosanna DeSoto as Adela Reynoso
 Gregg Henry as Williams
 William Allen Young as Larry Jennings
 Yaphet Kotto as Sergeant Therman Patterson
 Rockne Tarkington as William "Big William"
 James Gammon as Officer
 Ernie Hudson as Charles Wilson
 William Sanderson as Countee
 Marco Rodriguez as Ray Ortiz
 Tracee Lyles as Marion
 Jenny Gago as Gloria
 Ahmed Nurradin as Anthony DeHaven
 Bob Minor as J.W. Powers

References

External links
 Women of San Quentin at IMDb

1983 television films
1983 films
Films directed by William Graham (director)